The Miser's Doom is an 1899 British short film directed by Walter R. Booth.The film seems to be a lost film.

Plot
A miser is haunted by the ghost of one of his deceased victims, causing him to die of shock.

Production
The Miser's Doom was the directing debut of Walter R. Booth, a magician who had begun working with filmmaker R. W. Paul.

Legacy
The Miser's Doom is one of the earliest films featuring a ghost, although previous examples had been produced by Georges Méliès and George Albert Smith the previous year.

See also
 List of ghost films

References

1899 films
1899 horror films
1890s ghost films
1890s British films
British black-and-white films
British silent short films
Films directed by Walter R. Booth
British horror films
1899 short films
1890s directorial debut films
Silent horror films
1890s lost films